The 1976 Orange Bowl was the 42nd edition of the college football bowl game, played at the Orange Bowl in Miami, Florida, on Thursday, January 1. Part of the 1975–76 bowl game season, it matched the fifth-ranked Michigan Wolverines of the Big Ten Conference and the #3 Oklahoma Sooners of the Big Eight Conference. In the first meeting between these two teams, favored Oklahoma won 14–6.

This was the sixth and final Orange Bowl played on artificial turf; Poly-Turf, similar to AstroTurf, was installed before the 1970 season and two versions lasted six seasons. It was removed in early 1976, following Super Bowl X, and replaced with natural grass.

Teams

Michigan

The Wolverines (8–1–2) were the runner-up in the Big Ten Conference, after falling to rival Ohio State in Ann Arbor, 21–14. This was the first season that the Big Ten (and Pac-8) allowed multiple bowl teams.

Oklahoma

The Sooners were co-champions in the Big Eight Conference with Nebraska.  Oklahoma opened with eight wins before an unexpected 23–3 loss at home to Kansas, which snapped a 28-game winning streak (37-game unbeaten streak) and dropped them from second to sixth in the rankings. With wins over Missouri and Nebraska, they rose to third.

Game summary

Statistics

Aftermath
With top-ranked Ohio State's loss in the Rose Bowl, the Sooners were voted national champions. (Since the previous poll in early December, #2 Texas A&M lost twice and fell out of the top ten.)

References

External links
 Summary at Bentley Historical Library, University of Michigan Athletics History

Orange Bowl
Orange Bowl
Michigan Wolverines football bowl games
Oklahoma Sooners football bowl games
January 1976 sports events in the United States
Orange Bowl
1970s in Miami